Valeriu Gafencu (24 January 1921 – 18 February 1952) was a member of the Iron Guard who was active during the Legionnaires' rebellion.

He was declared "Saint of the Prisons" by theologian Nicolae Steinhardt for his "exemplary Christian conduct and devotion to those in suffering", and the Romanian Orthodox Church was reportedly considering his canonization in 2013.

Biography

Gafencu was born in 1921 in Sîngerei, at the time a city in Bessarabia, a region in the northeastern part of the Kingdom of Romania (now in the Republic of Moldova). Shortly after he graduated in 1940, the Soviet Union occupied Bessarabia and northern Bukovina; as a result, Gafencu and his family took refuge in Romania. 

Gafencu was declared an honorary citizen of the town of Târgu Ocna in 2009, but the decision was rescinded in 2013 due to his participation in the Legionnaires' rebellion in January 1941.

References

1921 births
1952 deaths
People from Sîngerei District
Romanian people of Moldovan descent
Members of the Romanian Orthodox Church
Members of the Iron Guard
Inmates of Aiud prison
Inmates of Pitești prison
Romanian prisoners and detainees
Romanian people who died in prison custody
Prisoners who died in Securitate custody